In the United States there have been numerous legal cases about regulations and laws that have decided the rights of street performers to perform in public. Most of these laws and regulations have been found to be unconstitutional when challenged. In the US, free speech is considered a fundamental right of every individual, guaranteed by the First and Fourteenth constitutional amendments, and in the majority of legal cases it has been concluded that practicing artistic free speech is legal. Street performing is legally considered to be artistic free speech and is protected, just as is panhandling or begging.

In the United States, reasons to regulate or ban street performing behavior include public safety issues and noise issues in certain areas such as hospital zones and residential zones. In residential zones, a reasonable curfew may be allowed. Such laws must be narrowly tailored to eliminate only the perceived evils by limiting the time, place, and manner that street performing may be practiced. They must also leave open reasonable alternative venues. The only exceptions to these free speech rules are sedition, as defined by the Smith Act, public displays of pornography and obscenity as defined by the Miller test for obscenity, criminal behavior such as fraud or defamation, certain commercial advertising and the common laws talked about above. In the US, laws regulating or banning street performing must be applied evenly to all forms of free speech according to the first and fourteenth constitutional amendments and the judicial decisions listed below.

Street performing cannot be prohibited in an area where other forms of free speech are not prohibited. For example, if street performing is regulated or banned but people are allowed to conduct free speech behavior for pickets, protests, religious, political, educational, sports, commercial or other purposes, then the law is illegal. In the United States any form of regulation on artistic free speech must not be judgmental, and permits must not be so restrictive, complex, difficult or expensive to obtain that they inhibit free speech. It is also unlawful per federal court decision for law officers to seize a performer's instruments.

Under Title 18, U.S.C., Section 241 Conspiracy Against Rights, it is unlawful for two or more persons to conspire to injure, oppress, threaten, or intimidate any person of any state, territory or district in the free exercise or enjoyment of any right or privilege secured to him/her by the Constitution or the laws of the United States, or because of his/her having exercised the same.

Under United States law, it is the express duty of all officers of the law or individuals such as security guards, legislators, mayors, Council Persons, judges, Hospitals and Nursing Home Proprietors, etc., to protect and preserve an individual's constitutional rights Under Title 18, U.S.C., Section 242 - Deprivation of Rights Under Color of Law. Most of these individuals take oaths to uphold the US Constitution. It is clearly a violation of federal law for these individuals to violate people's constitutional or civil rights under the color of the law.

Cases

References

Street performance
United States Free Speech Clause case law